Blaze of Sweden is a Swedish fashion brand founded the year 2013.

References

2013 establishments in Sweden
Clothing brands
Clothing companies of Sweden